Arantxa King (born 27 November 1989) is a Bermudian athlete competing in the long jump.

Biography
King was born in Paget Parish, Bermuda on 27 November 1989. Her mother, Branwen Smith-King, is a former Bermuda national track and field team member while her father Adrian King is a former international cricket player. Her sister Akilah was also an accomplished athlete at Brown University.

King competed at the 2005 IAAF World Youth Championships in Marrakech, Morocco. With a best jump of 6.39 m, she won the World Youth title in women's Long Jump. She competed at the 11th IAAF World Junior Championships in Beijing, China, in 2006, and the 12th IAAF World Junior Championships in Bydgoszcz, Poland, in 2008. She also competed for Bermuda at the 2008 Summer Olympics in Beijing, and in 2006, she also competed at the 2006 Commonwealth Games. She has competed at the XXX Olympic Games in London, England, in 2012, at the 14th IAAF World Championships in Moscow, Russia, in 2013, and the Commonwealth Games in Scotland, in 2014.

Internationally, King has won a silver medal in long jump at the 2011 Central American and Caribbean Championships in Mayaguez, Puerto Rico, and multiple junior medals in Carifta, Pan American Games, and Central American and Caribbean games.

King competed for Stanford University, where she was a two-time All-American and finished as a runner-up at the 2010 NCAA Outdoor Championships. She completed a degree in Political Science in 2011 and a master's degree in 2012 at Stanford.

National records
She holds the Bermuda national record for the women's long jump, both outdoors and indoors.

References

External links
 
 Stanford Cardinal bio

1989 births
Living people
Bermudian female long jumpers
Bermudian emigrants to the United States
Olympic athletes of Bermuda
Athletes (track and field) at the 2008 Summer Olympics
Athletes (track and field) at the 2012 Summer Olympics
Commonwealth Games competitors for Bermuda
Athletes (track and field) at the 2006 Commonwealth Games
Athletes (track and field) at the 2014 Commonwealth Games
Pan American Games competitors for Bermuda
Athletes (track and field) at the 2007 Pan American Games
World Athletics Championships athletes for Bermuda
Stanford Cardinal women's track and field athletes
People from Paget Parish
Bermudian people of Saint Vincent and the Grenadines descent